Fotherby is a village and civil parish in the East Lindsey district of Lincolnshire, England.

In the Domesday account Fotherby is written as "Fodrebi". Before the Conquest lordship was held by Thorgot Lag, and after, Berengar of Tosny, with Robert of Tosny as Tenant-in-chief.

In 1885 Kelly's noted six almshouses, built in 1866 for the benefit of six poor people by James Fowler, on the site of an older glebe house.

Fotherby Grade II listed Anglican church is dedicated to St Mary. It was entirely rebuilt by James Fowler in 1863, in Early English style with chancel, nave, south porch, and western tower with a broach spire containing three bells originally cast in 1608.

Further listed buildings are Mawers Farm on Peppin Lane, and a Sunday School building on Church Lane.

References

External links

"Fotherby", Genuki.org.uk. Retrieved 5 November 2011

Villages in Lincolnshire
Civil parishes in Lincolnshire
East Lindsey District